Carne a la tampiqueña is one of the most popular meat dishes in Mexico. It was created in 1939 by the restaurateur José Inés Loredo and his brother chef Fidel  from San Luis Potosí, who moved to the port of Tampico, Tamaulipas. 

Each ingredient was given a meaning. The oval platter represents the Huasteca; the strip of roasted meat, the Rio Panuco; the green enchiladas, the huasteco field; the white cheese, the purity of the people living in the Huasteca; the guacamole, the fruits of the region; the black beans, both the fertility of the land and the oil boom in the area.

See also
 List of meat dishes

References

Further reading
Muñoz Zurita, Ricardo. Pequeño Larousee de la Gastronomía Mexicana. (2013). 

Mexican cuisine
Meat dishes
1939 introductions